Berjaya University College (formerly known as Berjaya University College of Hospitality) is a private university college in Malaysia, located within Berjaya Times Square, Kuala Lumpur, Malaysia. Berjaya UC offers qualifications in business, culinary arts, hospitality and tourism higher education, as well as liberal arts, from foundation to postgraduate levels.

Berjaya University College partnership with various industry partners, including the Berjaya Corporation Group's hospitality and tourism businesses. Through these partnerships, students have the opportunity to undertake internships, industrial attachments, and work placements in leading companies, which helps them to develop their skills and gain valuable industry experience.

History
Berjaya UC received its licence from Malaysia's Ministry of Higher Education to operate as an institution of higher learning in November 2008.

Faculties 
Berjaya UC's programmes are offered via the following four faculties:

 BERJAYA Business School
 Faculty of Culinary Arts
 Faculty of Hospitality & Tourism - School of Hospitality
 Faculty of Hospitality & Tourism - School of Tourism
 Faculty of Liberal Arts - Berjaya Language Centre
 Faculty of Liberal Arts - Berjaya School of Communication & Media Arts
Faculty of Liberal Arts - Berjaya School of Humanities and Social Science

References

External links 
 Homepage

Berjaya Corporation
Berjaya Times Square
Private universities and colleges in Malaysia
Colleges in Malaysia
Universities and colleges in Kuala Lumpur
Hospitality schools in Malaysia
Business schools in Malaysia
Educational institutions established in 2009
2009 establishments in Malaysia